Jang Gyeong-hwan better known as MaRin, is a retired League of Legends esports player who was previously the top laner for TopSports Gaming. MaRin won the 2015 League of Legends World Championship with SK Telecom T1 and was named the Most Valuable Player of the event. He also played on SK Telecom T1 S before the team was consolidated with SK Telecom T1 K.

MaRin left SK Telecom T1 shortly after winning 2015 Worlds. On December 10, 2015, it was announced that he had joined LGD Gaming of the League of Legends Pro League (LPL) in Shanghai. He was replaced on the lineup by Lee “Duke” Ho-seong. MaRin returned to Korea's League of Legends Champions Korea (LCK) on December 12, 2016, signing with the Afreeca Freecs.

MaRin's signature champions are considered to be Rumble, Maokai, and Gnar.

Tournament results
 5th/8th - HOT6iX League of Legends Champions Korea Spring 2014 (SK Telecom T1 S)
 2nd - SKT LTE-A LoL Masters 2014 (Sk Telecom T1)
 4th - HOT6iX League of Legends Champions Korea Summer 2014 (SK Telecom T1 S)
 1st - League of Legends Champions Korea Spring 2015 (SK Telecom T1)
 2nd - Mid-season invitational 2015 (SK Telecom T1)
 1st - League of Legends Champions Korea Summer 2015 (SK Telecom T1)
 1st - 2015 League of Legends World Championship (SK Telecom T1)
 3rd/4th - NAVER 2015 LoL KeSPA Cup (SK Telecom T1)
 1st - 2015 All-Star Los Angeles (LCK)
 7th/8th - 2016 Spring LPL Playoffs (LGD Gaming)
 2nd - NEST 2016 (LGD Gaming)

References

Living people
South Korean esports players
South Korean expatriate sportspeople in China
T1 (esports) players
LGD Gaming players
League of Legends top lane players
Place of birth missing (living people)
Sportspeople from Shanghai
Year of birth missing (living people)